The 1982–83 Detroit Red Wings season was the Red Wings' 51st season, 57th overall for the franchise. They finished fifth in the Norris Division.

Offseason
After fifty years of Norris family ownership, Bruce A. Norris, who had himself owned the Red Wings since his father's passing in 1952, sold the Red Wings to Little Caesars Pizza founder Mike Ilitch. Ilitch then proceeded to hire general manager Jim Devellano away from the three-time defending Stanley Cup champion New York Islanders. Nick Polano was then hired as head coach, coming from the Buffalo Sabres where he had served as an assistant under Scotty Bowman.

Under this new management, the Red Wings opted to modernize their uniforms. The crew collars were replaced with V-necks, and the logo was realigned to be centered on the jersey, instead of having the wheel centered underneath the collar. The most striking change, though, was to the players' names and numbers. The Red Wings adopted vertically-arched lettering for the names on the back, as well as a fanciful number font with flourishes reminiscent of their wordmark. The unique number font would only last one year, though it would return for the Red Wings' 2014 Winter Classic uniforms, while the vertically-arched names remain a part of the Red Wings uniforms to this day.

Regular season

Final standings

Schedule and results

Playoffs
This was the fifth season in a row that the Red Wings failed to qualify for the Stanley Cup Playoffs.

Player statistics

Regular season
Scoring

Goaltending

Note: GP = Games played; G = Goals; A = Assists; Pts = Points; +/- = Plus-minus PIM = Penalty minutes; PPG = Power-play goals; SHG = Short-handed goals; GWG = Game-winning goals;
      MIN = Minutes played; W = Wins; L = Losses; T = Ties; GA = Goals against; GAA = Goals-against average;  SO = Shutouts;

Awards and records

Transactions

Draft picks
Detroit's draft picks at the 1982 NHL Entry Draft held at the Montreal Forum in Montreal, Quebec.

Farm teams

See also
1982–83 NHL season

References

External links

Detroit Red Wings seasons
Detroit
Detroit
Detroit Red
Detroit Red